Leomar is a given name. It may refer to:

 Leomar Quintanilha (born 1945), Brazilian politician
 Leomar Antônio Brustolin (born 1967), Brazilian Archbishop
 Léomar Leiria (born 1971), Brazilian football defensive midfielder
 Leomar Najorda (born 1982), Filipino basketball player
 Leomar (footballer) (born 1987), Leomar Francisco Rodrigues, Brazilian football defender
 Leomar Pinto (born 1997), Venezuelan football winger